Ostrów County (powiat ostrowski) may refer to either of two counties (powiats) in Poland:
Ostrów Mazowiecka County, in Masovian Voivodeship (east-central Poland)
Ostrów Wielkopolski County, in Greater Poland Voivodeship (west-central Poland)